Glendale, Arizona, held an election for mayor on August 30, 2016. It saw the reelection of Jerry Weiers.

Results

References 

2016
Glendale
Glendale